The following list presents the full set of National Register of Historic Places listings in Multnomah County, Oregon. However, please see separate articles (links below) for listings in each of Portland's six quadrants.

The National Register of Historic Places recognizes buildings, structures, objects, sites, and districts of national, state, or local historic significance across the United States. Out of over 90,000 National Register sites nationwide, Oregon is home to over 2,000, and over one-fourth of those are found in Multnomah County. In turn, the large majority (over 90%) of the county's National Register entries are situated within Portland.

This list includes only sites within Multnomah County but outside the municipal boundaries of Portland. While some sites appear in this list (and corresponding lists for neighboring counties) showing "Portland" as a general locality, based on their mailing addresses, they are nevertheless beyond city limits.

Current listings

Portland

Over 500 National Register listings lie within the municipal boundaries of Portland. Although all of these sites lie within Multnomah County, their sheer number makes it prohibitive to include them all in the same table. To find detailed listings for each of Portland's six quadrants, click on a link below or on the map at the right.

Lists by quadrant: North • Northeast • Northwest • Southeast • South and Southwest

Outside Portland

|}

Former listings

|}

Notes

References

 
Multnomah County